Portland, the largest city in the U.S. state of Oregon, is the site of 31 completed high-rises at least , four of which stand taller than . The tallest building in the city is the Wells Fargo Center, which rises  in Downtown Portland and was completed in 1972. The second-tallest skyscraper in the city is the U.S. Bancorp Tower, which rises  and was completed in 1983. KOIN Center, completed in 1983 and rising , is the third-tallest building in Portland. 

Although The Oregonian Building, rising  if its clock tower is included, was Portland's tallest building from 1892 until 1913, the history of skyscrapers in the city is thought to have begun with the construction of the Wells Fargo Building in 1907. This building, standing  and 12 floors tall, is often regarded as the first skyscraper in Portland. There are  three buildings under construction that are planned to rise at least .



Tallest buildings
This height includes spires and architectural details but does not include antenna masts.

Tallest under construction
, there are four buildings currently under construction in Portland that are planned to rise at least .

Tallest proposed
, there are four proposed buildings in Portland that would exceed  in height. These buildings are going through the permit and design review process with the intent to begin construction soon.

Timeline of tallest buildings

Since 1892, the year The Oregonian Building was completed, the title of the tallest building in Portland has been held by nine high-rises.

See also

 Architecture of Portland, Oregon
 List of tallest buildings in the United States / the world

Explanatory notes

References

General

Specific

External links
 Portland Skyscraper Diagram on SkyscraperPage

Tallest buildings in Portland
Portland, Oregon
Tallest